Wu Zhenglong (born November 1964) is a Chinese politician and who is currently a state councilor and the secretary-general of the State Council. Previously, he was Governor of Jiangsu, Communist Party Secretary of Nanjing and Communist Party Secretary of Jiangsu. Born in Jiangsu, Wu served in Chongqing, then Shanxi, earlier in his career, before being transferred back to his home province, where he experienced a series of rapid promotions.

Biography
Wu was born in Gaochun County, Jiangsu province. He graduated in 1984 from the Taiyuan Mechanical College (later renamed North University of China), where he studied machinery and equipment manufacturing, and worked in the military supply and industry ministry, before being transferred to the National Planning Commission to work as a political secretary. In 1999 he became deputy secretary-general of the Chongqing municipal government shortly after it became a direct-controlled municipality; he was then named deputy governor of Wanzhou District, then governor, then the party chief. Considered a "political survivor" in Chongqing, Wu served in the administration of then Chongqing party chief Bo Xilai, who was ousted in 2012. In May 2013 Wu was named secretary-general of the party committee, and a member of the party standing committee of Chonqging.

In 2014, Chen Chuanping was abruptly removed from office as party chief of Taiyuan as part of a corruption probe. Wu was 'parachuted' in as the new party chief of Taiyuan in August 2014; he also earned an ex officio seat on the provincial party standing committee. Wu served in Shanxi for two years, before being transferred back to his home province of Jiangsu to take on the post of deputy party chief and party chief of the provincial capital Nanjing, a clear promotion and indication that he was being groomed to higher office. In May 2017, Wu was appointed acting Governor of Jiangsu. On 18 October 2021, he was promoted to Communist Party Secretary of Jiangsu, the top political position in province.

Wu was a delegate to the 11th National People's Congress, elected in 2008. Wu was an alternate member of the 18th Central Committee of the Communist Party of China and a full member of the 19th Central Committee.

References

Politicians from Nanjing
Chinese Communist Party politicians from Jiangsu
1964 births
Living people
People's Republic of China politicians from Jiangsu
Governors of Jiangsu
Mayors of Taiyuan
Alternate members of the 18th Central Committee of the Chinese Communist Party
Members of the 19th Central Committee of the Chinese Communist Party
Delegates to the 12th National People's Congress
Delegates to the 11th National People's Congress